Woo-Duk Chung (born 1980) is a South Korean inventor. He is known for developing a wearable computer and a smartphone application software for accessing electricity market information.

Early life

Childhood
He became familiar with computers in the second grade of elementary school, and graduated the elementary school in Canada. During high school years, he set up a one-person venture company and developed a software that enabled switching between operating systems.

University
In September 2001, while being an undergraduate student of the Seoul National University, he developed a wearable computer that could easily be used in mobility and introduced it to the general public. This was intended to overcome the cumbersome aspects of the laptops and the low performance of the PDAs. Then in the 2002-2003 period, he worked on building a tablet computer. In the following years, he studied electricity market at the graduate school of the same university.

Career

Korea Power Exchange
While participating in the development of the Korean Energy Management System (K-EMS) as a researcher, he developed a free iPhone application in September 2010 that enabled the users to browse various information related to the electricity market, such as the status of real-time electricity supply and demand, transmission and distribution network information, wholesale electricity market price, introduction of the K-EMS, and 10 years' worth of historical grid operation data. It was the first of its kind in South Korea, and the general public could easily check to see if the overall electricity supply was dwindling. He then participated in the designing of the Future Electricity Market Operating System. After being promoted to the senior manager role, he became responsible for the international affairs of the company, working with organizations such as the World Bank.

Electric vehicles 
With the experience of driving a Chevrolet Bolt EV since 2018 at hand, he has been active in EV-themed online communities and published a thesis on analyzing the car's battery degradation trends using the accumulated driving data. Building upon the answers and shared information provided to the said communities, he published a reference book and wrote a series of opinion columns at a news outlet.

Wearable computer

Features
CPU, RAM, and OS used in the system are all desktop computer parts to preserve the performance characteristics as much as possible, but a miniature form factor industrial motherboard was used in order to enhance portability. A self-designed power supply unit let the system use conventional batteries. Total cost to build was approximately KRW 2 to 2.5 million (US$1,740 to 2,170). It was able to run Microsoft Office, display TV broadcast, and play 3D video games such as Quake III Arena and Max Payne. It could also connect to Internet wirelessly via mobile phone.

Showcases

TV & radio appearances

Awards and nominations

Literary works

References

South Korean inventors
1980 births
Living people
Seoul National University alumni